The Seaside class is a class of four cruise ships owned and operated by MSC Cruises. The lead ship of the class, entered service in the Caribbean Sea in December 2017. A fourth cruise ship, the MSC Seascape was christened in New York on December 7, 2022.

Design and engineering
The Seaside class is based on Fincantieri's "Project Mille". The maximum passenger capacity is 5,119, with a crew complement of 1,413.

Seaside-class ships are powered by a diesel-electric genset system, with four Wärtsilä engines driving GE Marine electrical equipment. Main propulsion is via two propellers, each driven by a  electric motor; four forward and three aft  thrusters allow for close-quarters maneuvering.

Construction 
The first two ships were ordered in May 2014 from Fincantieri, with each ship costing US$700 million, and scheduled to be delivered in November 2017 and May 2018, respectively. The order also came with an option for a third vessel. 

Upon delivery of MSC Seaside in November 2017, MSC Cruises announced that it signed an order from Fincantieri for two new vessels that were to be an evolution from the existing Seaside-class platform, a sub-class to be dubbed "Seaside EVO". MSC explained that the option to build a third Seaside-class vessel was replaced with a new agreement to build the two Seaside EVO-class ships. Delivery for the two ships is expected for 2021 and 2022, respectively.

So far all of the ships of this class have been given the "Sea" prefix.

Ships in class

References

Seaside-class Cruise Ship
Ships of MSC Cruises